Franz Egon von Fürstenberg may refer to:
 Franz Egon von Fürstenberg-Heiligenberg
 Franz Egon von Fürstenberg (1737–1825)
 Franz Egon von Fürstenberg-Stammheim